The Victorian Minister for Transport and Infrastructure is a minister within the Cabinet of Victoria. The minister's area of responsibility includes overseeing transport projects, major road projects, and the Victorian Department of Transport. 

A number of acts of parliament give the minister executive powers relevant to the portfolio, these include the Development Victoria Act 2003, Major Transport Projects Facilitation Act 2009, North East Link Act 2020, Transport Integration Act 2010, Victorian Planning Authority Act 2017, and the West Gate Tunnel (Truck Bans and Traffic Management) Act 2019.

Ministers

Reference list  

Victoria State Government
Ministers of the Victoria (Australia) state government